The 2022 Ambato La Gran Ciudad was a professional tennis tournament played on clay courts. It was the second edition of the tournament which was part of the 2022 ATP Challenger Tour. It took place in Ambato, Ecuador between 17 and 23 October 2022.

Singles main-draw entrants

Seeds

 1 Rankings are as of 10 October 2022.

Other entrants
The following players received wildcards into the singles main draw:
  Andrés Andrade
  Álvaro Guillén Meza
  Cayetano March

The following player received entry into the singles main draw using a protected ranking:
  Jan Choinski

The following players received entry into the singles main draw as alternates:
  Sean Cuenin
  Arklon Huertas del Pino

The following players received entry from the qualifying draw:
  Sriram Balaji
  Conner Huertas del Pino
  Kosuke Ogura
  Kiranpal Pannu
  Jorge Panta
  Matías Zukas

Champions

Singles

  Facundo Bagnis def.  João Lucas Reis da Silva 7–6(9–7), 6–4.

Doubles

  Santiago Rodríguez Taverna /  Thiago Agustín Tirante def.  Benjamin Lock /  Courtney John Lock 7–6(13–11), 6–3.

References

2022 ATP Challenger Tour
2022 in Ecuadorian sport
October 2022 sports events in Ecuador